The China Energy Label (CEL，) is an energy consumption label for products in China, similar to the European Union energy label. Manufacturers of specified electronic devices are obligated to attach a CEL label to their goods to inform China-based consumers of the product's energy efficiency. The label includes the product's energy efficiency class (1–5) as well as information regarding its energy consumption.

Targets 
The CEL shows the level of energy consumption and, thus, the energy efficiency of a product. The CEL aims to encourage customers to buy energy efficient products. The target to increase energy efficiency and the acceptance of Chinese consumers towards energy efficient products is highly important, since China is the world's largest energy consumer.

Responsible authority
Applications are to be filed at the China Energy Label Center (CELC), which is the main authority for CEL-classification.

Products requiring CEL 
Since the introduction of China Energy Label in 2005, more than 25 product groups have become CEL-mandatory, while additional classes continually being added to the product catalogue. For every product that requires CEL, a GB-Standard has been implemented.

Among the CEL mandatory products are:
 Motors
 Air conditioners
 Refrigerators
 Washing machines
 Gas kettles
 Water kettles
 Photocopiers
 Air compressors
 Flat-screen televisions
 Fluorescent tube

See also 
  European Union energy label, the energy rating label in the European Economic Area
  EnergyGuide, the energy rating label in the United States
   Energy rating label, the energy rating label in the Australia and New Zealand

References

External links
 https://web.archive.org/web/20140506234559/http://www.energylabel.gov.cn/en/

Government agencies of China
Energy conservation
Energy policy
Energy in China
Rating systems
Energy consumption
Labels